Deadpool is a pinball machine designed by George Gomez and released by Stern Pinball in August 2018 based on the comic books of the same name.  Nolan North provided voicework as the voice of Deadpool. Brian Huskey provided the voice of Lil' Deadpool and Jennifer Lafleur provided the voice of Dazzler.

It is the second pinball table to be based on the character, with the first one being a virtual pinball table from the Marvel Pinball video game, developed by Zen Studios.

Overview
Stern created three versions; Pro, Premium and Limited Edition.

The Premium and Limited Edition models feature an additional 8 drop targets, motorized disco ball with disco illumination effects, custom molded Wolverine and Dazzler action figures, and with a custom molded chimichanga truck time machine.

The Limited Edition model is limited to 500 units and features a numbered plaque, custom themed backglass, cabinet artwork and art blades as well as a shaker motor and anti-reflection glass.

Both Premium (Cassette) and Limited Edition (12-inch vinyl) models come with a Deadpool soundtrack featuring 11 music tracks which differ from those included on the Deadpool soundtrack.

Game play
Deadpool includes 4 different skill shots, 6 battles modes, 4 quest modes and 3 wizard modes.

References

External links
 (2018 Stern Pro version)
 (2018 Stern Premium version)
 (2018 Stern Limited Edition version)

Pinball machines based on films
Pinball machines based on comics
2018 pinball machines
Stern pinball machines